Pterocissus is a plant genus in the family Vitaceae.

References

External links 

 Pterocissus at The Plant List (retrieved 2 April 2016)

Vitaceae
Vitaceae genera